Sam Battle may refer to:

 Samuel J. Battle - American police office, parole, commissioner and porter
 Sam Battle - aka Look Mum No Computer, a youtuber, electronics wiz and musician.